A glyptotheque is a collection of sculptures. It is part of the name of several museums and art galleries. 

The designation glyptotheque was coined by the librarian of King Ludwig I of Bavaria, derived from the Ancient Greek verb glyphein (γλύφειν), meaning "cut into stone". It was an allusion to the word pinacotheca (from πίναξ pinax, "panel" or "painting"). Glypton (γλυπτόν) is the Greek word for a sculpture.

Museums that today bear this name or cognates of it include:

 Glyptothek, in Munich, Germany
 Ny Carlsberg Glyptotek, in Copenhagen, Denmark
 National Glyptotheque, in Athens, Greece
 Gliptoteka, in Zagreb, Croatia

See also
 Lapidarium

Types of art museums and galleries
History of museums
Ancient Greek sculpture